Shiva Institute of Engineering and Technology, or SIET Bilaspur, is a private coeducational college of engineering located in Bilaspur, Himachal Pradesh, India.

History
Shiva group was started in the year 2007, commencing with Shiva College of Education under the aegis of Shiva Educational Society at Ghumarwin Distt. Bilaspur (HP). This was the first College of Education in Distt. Bilaspur (NAAC accredited) with an intake of 200 seats. In 2010, Shiva college of Education has also got permission to run IGNOU study centre for B.Ed. course having 100 seats.

In 2009, the group has started an Engineering College named Shiva Institute of Engineering & Technology at Chandpur, Bilaspur (HP), offering under graduate program in five disciplines viz. Civil Engineering, Mechanical Engineering, Electronics and Communication Engineering, Electrical and Electronics Engineering and Computer Science & Engineering leading to B.Tech. degree. In 2013, Group has started a Polytechnic named Shiva Polytechnic offering Diploma courses viz. Civil Engineering and Mechanical Engineering.

Campus
The campus is located at Luhnoo Kanatain, P.O. Chandpur, Teh. Sadar District, Bilapur (H.P.)

Admission
Admission to Bachelor of Technology (B.Tech) degree is done on the basis of the score in All India Engineering Entrance Examination (AIEEE) through a state level counselling conducted by the Directorate of Technical Education, Himachal Pradesh.

University affiliation
The institute is affiliated to Himachal Pradesh University, Shimla.
This Institute is affiliated to AICTE and Himachal Pradesh Technical University, Hamirpur.

Academic departments
 Department of Applied Sciences and Humanities
Department of Civil Engineering
Department of Computer Science and Engineering
Department of Electronics and Communication Engineering
Department of Mechanical Engineering

Degree programs
The institute awards Bachelor of Technology (B.Tech) in the following disciplines:

Civil Engineering 
Computer Science and Engineering
Electronics and Communication Engineering
Mechanical Engineering
Electrical & Electronics Engineering
Chemical engineering

References

External links
 Official website

Engineering colleges in Himachal Pradesh
Education in Bilaspur district, Himachal Pradesh